Antonio Salazar Calzado  (born 15 October 1965 in Madrid) is a former Spanish baseball center fielder. He played with Spain at the 1992 Summer Olympics. He had 6 hits in 19 at-bats over 6 games.

References

1965 births
Living people
Sportspeople from Madrid
Olympic baseball players of Spain
Spanish baseball players
Baseball players at the 1992 Summer Olympics
Baseball outfielders